Rank comparison chart of naval forces of Oceanian states.

Enlisted

See also
 Comparative navy enlisted ranks of the Americas
 Comparative navy enlisted ranks of the Commonwealth
 Ranks and insignia of NATO navies enlisted

References

Military comparisons